Patricia Payne may refer to:
 Patricia Payne (screenwriter)
 Patricia Payne (mezzo-soprano)